The Tanana soil is the official state soil of Alaska.

Profile
The Tanana soil consists of shallow, well drained, moderately permeable soils formed in materials weathered from limestone. They are gently sloping to very steep soils on foot slopes and side slopes of limestone hills. Slopes range from 2 to 60 percent.

See also
Pedology (soil study)
Soil types
List of U.S. state soils

External links
NRCS: Tanana Soil

Pedology
Soil in the United States
Geology of Alaska
Symbols of Alaska
Types of soil
Tanana Athabaskans